Angela Alvarado is an American actress and director. She was the wife of singer Draco Rosa.

Early life 
Alvarado was born in Ponce, Puerto Rico

Career 
Alvarado is the director of several of her husband's music videos, including "Madre Tierra", "Mas y Mas", "Lie Without a Lover", and "Dancing in the Rain". The last three videos come from the album Mad Love, released in 2004. Alvarado worked closely with her husband for the production of this record. In September 2004, alongside her husband, Alvarado won a Latin Grammy Award for the video "Mas y Mas".

Alvarado appeared in the 1993 film Judgment Night, the 1997 film Hollywood Confidential, in the 2001 TV movie Boss of Bosses (starring Chazz Palminteri) and in the 2007 drama Freedom Writers, playing the mother of April Lee Hernandez's character. In 2003 she was in the NBC series Kingpin as DEA agent Delia Flores.

Alvarado recorded a public service announcement for Deejay Ra's 'Hip-Hop Literacy' campaign. She also appeared as the main character (dancer) in the Tears for Fears video: Woman In Chains.

Personal life 
Alvarado first met her husband during the production of the 1988 film Salsa. The couple married in 1988. Rosa reignited his solo musical career in 1994 with the album Frio. That same year, the couple had their first child, Revel. Rosa continued producing albums for other artists while Alvarado remained dedicated to raising her son. By 2001, the couple had another son, Redamo.

Filmography

Film

Television

References 

Living people
Actresses from New York City
American film actresses
American television actresses
American people of Puerto Rican descent
1964 births
21st-century American women